Leistnerhübel is a mountain of Saxony, southeastern Germany. It is 879m high, and is located 1 km south Ore Mountains.

Mountains of Saxony
Mountains of the Ore Mountains